Reptile is an upcoming American crime thriller film co-written and directed by Grant Singer in his feature-film directorial debut.

Premise
A New England detective works to solve the murder of a real estate agent, and as a result of the case experiences a reflection upon himself.

Cast

Production

Development
On August 26, 2021, Netflix was set to produce the crime thriller script Reptile with music video director Grant Singer set to make his directorial feature film debut and Molly Smith, Trent Luckinbill, Seth Spector, Thad Luckinbill, Benicio Del Toro, and Rachel Smith will produce the film. On October 14, 2021, Singer and Brewer were credited as co-writers.

Casting
Along with the announcement on August 26, 2021, Del Toro and Justin Timberlake were cast in the film. On September 30, 2021, Alicia Silverstone, Michael Pitt, Ato Essandoh, Frances Fisher, Eric Bogosian, Domenick Lombardozzi, Karl Glusman, Matilda Lutz, Owen Teague, and Catherine Dyer were cast in the film. On October 14, 2021, Mike Pniewski, Thad Luckinbill, Sky Ferreira, James Devoti, and Michael Beasley were cast in the film.

Filming
On August 15, 2021, filming began in Atlanta, Georgia.

References

External links
 

Upcoming films
American crime thriller films
Black Label Media films
Films shot in Atlanta
Upcoming directorial debut films
Upcoming English-language films
Upcoming Netflix original films